What Happens in Aldershot Stays in Aldershot is an hour-long documentary film that follows the band Reuben on tour, in the studio and at work for three months, trying to portray what it's like to be in an underground British rock band in this day and age.

Also included on the double disc DVD is a full recording of the band's show at London's Mean Fiddler on 27 April 2006, all of the video diaries from the making of the third album  and a few hidden extras.

The DVD was sold at their February 2007 tour, and was originally only available on the Hideous Records website and in several independent music stores across the country.

Mean Fiddler Show Track listing
(Song names as stated on the DVD cover)

 A Kick In The Mouth
 Stuck In My Throat
 Keep It To Yourself
 Alpha Signal 15
 We're All Going Home In An Ambulance 
 Nobody Loves You
 Horrorshow
 Stux
 No One Wins The War
 Lights Out
 Agony/Agatha
 Every Time A Teenager Listens To Drum & Bass A Rockstar Dies
 Cities On Fire
 Boy
 Return Of The Jedi
 Freddy Kreuger

 "Alpha Signal 15" consists of the three songs "Alpha Signal Three", "Alpha Signal Five", and "Alpha Signal Seven" which were played back-to-back in that order. Those numbers added together result in 15.
 "Freddy Kreuger" is played with the band members rearranged onto different instruments. Instead, Jamie Lenman performs on drums, Guy Davis plays the bass and adds backing vocals, and Jon Pearce plays guitar and lead vocals.
 At that time of performance and release, the band's third and currently final album In Nothing We Trust was yet to be released. The songs "We're All Going Home In An Ambulance", "Agony/Agatha", and "Cities On Fire" were still at the time unfinished songs.
 The opening and verse riffs in the song "Agony/Agatha" are performed on guitar as opposed to piano.

Reuben (band) video albums